Laadam is a 2009 Indian Tamil-language gangster thriller film written and directed by Prabhu Solomon and produced by Ponnurangam. The film stars debutant Aravindhan and Charmy Kaur, while Kota Srinivasa Rao, Jayaprakash, Dheeraj Kher and Manorama play supporting roles. The music was composed by Dharan. This film is loosely based on 2006 crime thriller film "Lucky Number Slevin". The film released on 20 February 2009. Upon release, the film was dubbed into Telugu as 16 Days with an additional scene with Dharmavarapu Subrahmanyam.

Plot
The story begins with Kunjidhapadam, who comes from a small place to the city for an interview. He manages to find place to stay with his distant relative Subramanyam, who is actually a defaulter on loans taken on interest. He is absconding but then leaves his key at a secret place. Kunjidhapadam takes the key and stays, and he also manages to get a job. On the other hand, Angel grows as an orphan and works with a mineral water company. She does not have a place to stay so she locates those houses without occupants, stays there for a night, and gets going in the morning. One such instance gets her to Kunjidhapadam's house. All this apart, there are two dons Pavadai and Vembuli, who are out to kill each other. Vembuli is successful in killing Pavadai's son. Pavadai vows to kill Vembuli's son by the twelfth day ceremony of his son.

A twist of fate occurs, and Pavadai's goons mistake Kunjidhapadam to be Subrahmanyam and get him to take money. Kunjidhapadam gives an idea to kill Vembuli's son and is given a 16-day deadline to do so; else, Pavadai threatens to kill him. Vembuli learns of this and tries to kill Kunjidhapadam, but he comes alive. After that, Kunjidhapadam again meets Angel and tries to get money from her to give it back to Pavadai, which Subramanyam has to give. At that time, Pavadai realizes and confirms that Kunjidhapadam has to kill Vembuli's son. On the way back, he meets the opposite gangsters and tries to escape from them. The gangsters get his files, which contain his degree certificate. After that, he meets Angel and returns her money, which Pavadai returned with double of the amount and a gun. He meets Angel, and both plan to stay in actor Vadivelu's house/Sunil (actor)'s house (in the Telugu dubbed version).

After that, both Kunjithapadam and Angel follow a man working under Vembuli and go inside a restaurant, where Kunjithapadam manages to get information about Vembuli's son, who is hidden in a moving airbus with many securities. Kunjithapadam is in search of the bus and finds it. After that, he tries to stop the bus and wants to talk with Vembuli's son. He tells him about all the things that happened with Pavadai and asks him to give him a job with security from Pavadai. However, they ordered not to face each other again, or else he will be killed.

Soon after, Kunjithapadam and Angel go to a minister's house to stay at night. They get caught in the morning, but the manage to escape from the minister's gang. A police officer tries to escape them. He brings both of them to the station and mistakenly makes them get married. The police officer brought them to his house because their marriage is the 100th marriage done in the police station. The first night in the house has been arranged. At that time, both Angel and Kunjidhapadam become closer and fall in love.

The next day, Kunjithapadam tries to see Vembuli's son, who is in a small boat. Some of Vembuli's henchmen were playing in the beach and throw Kunjithapadam son into the sea. Kunjithapadam manages to swim and reach the boat, also asking for his degree certificate. Vembuli's henchmen tore all the certificates, and one of the henchmen asks him to send Angel to him for prostitution. Kunjidhapadam got angry kills Vembuli's son and brings his body in a small boat to the beach where all gangsters were playing and kills all of Vembuli's henchmen. After that, he brings the body to Vembuli's house. He then kidnaps Vembuli and Pavadai, keeps both of them tied to a rock area, and murders them.

Kunjithapadam again joins with Angel and starts back to Hyderabad. The film ends with them both getting on in a train for a brighter future.

Cast

Aravindhan as Kunjidhapadam
Charmy Kaur as Angel
Kota Srinivasa Rao as Pavadai
Jayaprakash as Vembuli
Dheeraj 
Manorama
Jasper
Chitti Babu as SI Gabriel
Nellai Siva
Lollu Sabha Manohar as Constable
Vasu Vikram
Munnar Ramesh as Vembuli's henchman
Vidharth as Vembuli's henchman
George Maryan as Pavadai's henchman
Kunal Shah (guest appearance)

Production

Charmy Kaur took Tamil lessons to become fluent in the language prior to the film, and she also underwent training in motorcycle riding for her role. Soon after the launch of the film, the original producers, Chozha Creations, sold their stake in the film to Cosmos Entertainment. To capitulate on Charmy's popularity in Andhra Pradesh, a Telugu version has been readied to be released shortly after the release of the original.

The film in October 2008, faced a high court order staying its release. The petition against the movie was filed by Ponnurangan on behalf of Chozha Creations, giving an issue is one of financial settlement between Chozha Creations and Cosmos Enterprises, the producers of Laadam. In the petition, it has been said that Laadam was being initially produced by Chozha Creations. But, midway through the making, the movie was sold outright to Cosmos Enterprises for a sum of Rs. 90 lakhs as per an agreement reached in June. But, Chozha Creations claims to have received only Rs. 40 lakhs to date and have thus filed the petition. In the interim, Laadam has been completed and is ready for release. But this stay order might now delay or even worse, prevent its release. The high court has given a period of two weeks for Cosmos Enterprises to file an explanation.

Soundtrack 
From the music composed by Dharan, two songs have been recorded, one each by Dr. Burn and Emcee Jezz, both rappers of the Malaysian-based band Natchatra.

"Siru Thoduthalile" – Bombay Jayashree, Haricharan
"Makkah" – Benny Dayal, Haricharan
"Atlantic Ocean" – Suchitra
"Gangster" – Dr. Burn, Benny Dayal

Reception
Behindwoods wrote "Although Prabhu Solomon’s earnest attempt at making a spooky thriller is evident, the predictable plot and screenplay prove to be a let down." Rediff wrote "Laadam might have a few minor loop-holes but Prabhu Solomon's script (even if it's been liberally borrowed from abroad) puts up a good show."

References

External links
 

2009 films
2000s Tamil-language films
Films directed by Prabhu Solomon
Films scored by Dharan Kumar